Abarema glauca, the glaucous abarema, is a tree species in the legume family (Fabaceae). It is found in the Bahamas, Cuba, and Hispaniola (the Dominican Republic and Haiti). Abarema glauca is found most easily on the east coast of Dominican Republic, in Uvero Alto, north of Punta Cana.

Names
Common rural names are: caracolí, nijaguao, paují (Pittier), jijaguao,  and merey montañero (Hoyos).

Footnotes

References
  (2005): Abarema glauca. Version 10.01, November 2005. Retrieved 2008-MAR-30.
 

glauca
Flora of Cuba
Flora of Haiti
Trees of the Dominican Republic
Taxonomy articles created by Polbot
Flora of the Bahamas